First of the Summer Wine is a British sitcom written by Roy Clarke that aired on BBC1. The pilot originally aired on 3 January 1988, and the first series of episodes followed on 4 September 1988. The show ran for two series of six episodes each, with the final episode airing on 8 October 1989. The pilot episode was produced and directed by Gareth Gwenlan. Both series of episodes were produced and directed by Mike Stephens.  The BBC has never shown repeats of the show, although repeats do occasionally appear in the UK on Gold.  The show was broadcast in Australia on the Australian Broadcasting Corporation network in the early 1990s.

First of the Summer Wine is a prequel to Clarke's long running show, Last of the Summer Wine, portraying the youth of the principal characters from the mother show in the months leading up to World War II. With the possibility of war hanging over them, the young men and women enjoy their youth while trying to find a place for themselves in the world. The show used young, mostly unknown actors to play the characters, with only two actors from the original series making an appearance in the prequel.

Production
With the success of Last of the Summer Wine, the BBC approved a new series which Roy Clarke would carry over characters of the original show. With the new series, Clarke hoped to show the lives of his characters as they were in the "first summer" of their lives, as opposed to the last summer depicted in Last of the Summer Wine. While there would still be the "shadow of the Grim Reaper" hanging over them, this time it would be because of World War II, not due to their old age.

For the new series, Clarke used mostly young, inexperienced actors to fill the roles of the characters carried over from the original series. The actors were required to mimic the vocal characteristics and mannerisms already established in Last of the Summer Wine to create a continuity between the two series.

The show features much 1920s and 1930s music, which adds to the nostalgic feel of the show. The theme tune is "Sweet and Lovely", sung by Al Bowlly, accompanied by Roy Fox and his Band.  The recording was made in London on 18 September 1931.

Characters

First of the Summer Wine followed a group of young men and women, some of whom were adapted from Last of the Summer Wine, with others being specifically created for the new show. The men consisted of Paul Wyett as the scruffy and immature Compo Simmonite; David Fenwick as meek and deep-thinking Norman Clegg; Paul McLain as snobbish ladder-climber Seymour Utterthwaite; Richard Lumsden as the eager soldier Foggy Dewhurst; Gary Whitaker as the love-smitten Wally Batty; and Paul Oldham as their friend, Sherbert. The women consisted of Helen Patrick as the object of Wally's affections, Nora Renshaw; Sarah Dangerfield as Ivy; Joanne Heywood as Dilys, Judy Flynn as Lena, and Linda Davidson as Anita Pillsworth.

The adults around the young people act as supporting characters. Peter Sallis and Maggie Ollerenshaw play David and Violet Clegg, Norman's parents. Derek Benfield portrays Mr Scrimshaw, the manager of the shop where Ivy, Dilys, Sherbert, Norman and Seymour work.

Scenario
First of the Summer Wine takes place between May and September 1939, in the months leading up to World War II. The series revolves around the diary entries of the young Norman Clegg. Each episode begins with him resting on his bedroom windowsill and greeting the day; the words "the diary of Norman Clegg, aged 18 years" introduce the theme of each episode.

Episodes revolve around the antics of the young men of a small Yorkshire village and their usually level-headed female counterparts, all of whom are grappling with the world around them, their youth, and their experiences with the opposite sex. With rumblings of war on the European continent as Hitler's Nazi Germany and the United Kingdom become increasingly poised for war, the lives of the young men and women will be changed forever.

The scenario uses retroactive continuity. In Last of the Summer Wine, Seymour is introduced in later series, and is initially unknown to the other central characters.

Episodes

Series 1 (1988)

Series 2 (1989)

Home video releases

See also
Yorkshire dialect and accent

Notes

References

External links

1988 British television series debuts
1989 British television series endings
1980s British sitcoms
BBC television sitcoms
Television shows set in Yorkshire
Last of the Summer Wine
Television series set in the 1930s
English-language television shows
Prequel television series